This is a list of Prefecture songs of Japan. Forty-four of the forty-seven prefectures of Japan have one or more official prefecture songs.

Those prefectures that do not have a prefecture songs are Osaka, Hiroshima and Ōita. However, all except Ōita have unofficial prefectural songs. It is sometimes believed that Hyōgo does not have an official prefecture song, but the song "Hyōgo Kenminka" has adopted in 1947.

Prefecture songs

Former Prefecture song

References

 
Lists of songs
Japan
Songs